Douglas Mendes may refer to:

Douglas Mendes (footballer, born 1988), full name Douglas Augusto Mendes dos Santos, Brazilian football centre back
Douglas Mendes (footballer, born 2004), full name Douglas Mendes Moreira, Brazilian football centre back